Malachi's Cove is a 1974 British-Canadian coming-of-age period drama film directed by Henry Herbert and starring Donald Pleasence, Veronica Quilligan and Dai Bradley. It is based on the short story Malachi's Cove by Anthony Trollope and is also known as The Seaweed Children.

Plot
In North Cornwall, 1880, Mally Trenglos is a tough young girl aged sixteen who collects seaweed and sells it as fertilizer for the local farmers. She lives with her grandfather Malachi in a little hut above the cove where she collects seaweed. Her parents died two years before from drowning. When Mally's mother discovered her father's body, she wanted him to be buried and stayed with his body in a dangerous storm. Mally went in the village to get help but no one came. The Gunliffes, a local farming family, answered but didn't believe her. By the time she was back at the sea, Mally's mother was dead.

The film focuses on the life of Mally, her grandfather and Barty Gunliffe, a local boy (son of the family who didn't believe Mally when she claimed of her mum's drowning) who keeps taking weed from their cove. Barty and Mally remain enemies until one day when Barty comes to prove to Mally that he's not afraid. As a result, he hits his head on a rock. He is unconscious but Mally manages to pull him from the sea. Luckily though Barty survives. However, Mrs. Gunliffe, who despises Mally, has a suspicion that Mally did it to kill him. In the end, Barty and Mally become friends and the film ends with Barty helping Mally collect the seaweed.

Cast
 Donald Pleasence as Malachi Trenglos
 Dai Bradley as Barty Gunliffe
 Veronica Quilligan as Mally Trenglos
 Peter Vaughan as Mr. Gunliffe
 Lillias Walker as Mrs. Gunliffe
 Arthur English as Jack Combes 
 David Howe as Jake Combes 
 Kennaley Hoyle as Matt Combes 
 John Barrett as Reverend Polwarth
 Alan Hockey as Dr. Peverick
 George Malpas as Mr. Eliot 
 Meg Wynn Owen as Mally's mother 
 Peter Wyatt as Mr. Carew
 David Foxxe as Mr. Carew's Clerk
 Derek Carpenter as Dr. Peverick's Assistant
 Claire Davenport as Lady in Store
 Linda Robson and Pauline Quirke as Girls in Store

Production
Jacquemine Charrott Lodwidge was the film's art director and was also brought in for Herbert's next film, Emily (1976).

Filming
The film was made at Bray Studios and the location filming was carried out in Trebarwith Strand but most was in Clovelly.

References

External links

1974 films
English-language Canadian films
1974 drama films
Films directed by Henry Herbert
Films set in the 1880s
Films set in Cornwall
British drama films
Canadian drama films
1970s Canadian films
1970s British films